Extriplex joaquinana is a species known by the common name San Joaquin saltbush. It was formerly included in genus Atriplex.

Distribution
It is endemic to California, where it grows in alkaline soils in the Sacramento-San Joaquin River Delta and adjacent parts of the Central Valley and eastern Central Coast Ranges.

Description
This is an annual herb growing erect to a maximum height near one meter. The leaves are 1 to 7 centimeters in length, often scaly, green to gray-green in color, and oval to triangular in shape. The leaves are mostly located lower on the erect plant; those further up the stem are reduced in size. The inflorescences of male flowers are dense, heavy spikes, and the female flowers are held in smaller clusters.

Systematics 
The first publication of this taxon was in 1904 by Aven Nelson as Atriplex joaquinana A.Nelson (in: Proceedings of the Biological Society of Washington 17(12): 99). (It has sometimes been wrongly spelled Atriplex joaquiniana). In 2010, after phylogenetic research, Elizabeth H. Zacharias classified it in a new genus Extriplex, as Extriplex joaquinana (A.Nelson) E.H.Zacharias.
Extriplex joaquinana belongs to the tribe Atripliceae in the subfamily Chenopodioideae of Amaranthaceae.

References

External links

 
USDA Plants Profile for Atriplex joaquinana
Atriplex joaquinana — UC Photo gallery

Chenopodioideae
Endemic flora of California
Halophytes
Natural history of the California Coast Ranges
Natural history of the Central Valley (California)
~
Plants described in 1904
Taxa named by Aven Nelson
Flora without expected TNC conservation status